The 2013 Beijing International Challenger was a professional tennis tournament played on outdoor hard courts. It was the fourth edition of the tournament which was part of the 2013 ATP Challenger Tour and the 2013 ITF Women's Circuit, both offering a total of $75,000 in prize money. It took place in Beijing, China, on 8–14 July 2013.

ATP entrants

Seeds 

 1 Rankings as of 24 June 2013

Other entrants 
The following players received wildcards into the singles main draw:
  Bai Yan
  Wang Chuhan
  Ning Yuqing
  Ouyang Bowen

The following player received entry using a protected ranking:
  Kaden Hensel

The following players received entry from the qualifying draw:
  Hung Jui-chen
  Na Jung-woong
  Jun Woong-Sun
  Erik Crepaldi

WTA entrants

Seeds 

 1 Rankings as of 24 June 2013

Other entrants 
The following players received wildcards into the singles main draw:
  Xun Fangying
  Wang Yan
  Ye Qiuyu
  Yang Zhaoxuan

The following players received entry from the qualifying draw:
  Liu Fangzhou
  Jang Su-jeong
  Liu Wanting
  Wen Xin

The following players received entry into the singles main draw as Lucky Losers:
  Tang Haochen
  Zhou Xiao

The following players received entry by a Protected Ranking:
  Michaëlla Krajicek

Champions

Men's singles

  Lu Yen-Hsun def.  Go Soeda 6–2, 6–4

Men's doubles

  Toshihide Matsui /  Danai Udomchoke def.  Gong Maoxin /  Zhang Ze 4–6, 7–6(8–6), [10–8]

Women's singles

  Zhang Shuai def.  Zhou Yimiao 6–2, 6–1

Women's doubles

  Liu Chang /  Zhou Yimiao def.  Misaki Doi /  Miki Miyamura 7–6(7–1), 6–4

External links 
 Official website
 2013 Beijing International Challenger at ITFtennis.com

2013 ITF Women's Circuit
Hard court tennis tournaments